Prison Architect is a private prison construction and management simulation video game developed and published by Introversion Software. It was made available as a crowdfunded paid alpha pre-order on September 25, 2012 with updates scheduled every three to four weeks. Prison Architect was an entrant in the 2012 Independent Games Festival. The game was available on Steam's Early Access program, and was officially released on October 6, 2015.

In 2019, Paradox Interactive acquired the rights to Prison Architect for an undisclosed sum.

Gameplay
The game is a top-down 2D (with a partially 3D mode) construction and management simulation where the player has been hired by the CEO of a for-profit prison company to take control of building and running a prison. The player's role is of both architect and governor with sandbox micromanagement themes, responsible for managing various aspects of the prison, including building facilities, connecting utilities, and managing staff. The player needs to recruit specific staff to unlock some aspects of the game (e.g., information about the prison's finances is unavailable without an accountant). The player is also responsible for the finances of their prison, and for meeting the needs of their prisoners (e.g., sanitation). The player is also able to implement various reform and labour programmes that reduce the specific prisoner's recidivism rate. The player tells the prisoners what to do indirectly by setting their schedule. The game takes inspiration from Theme Hospital, Dungeon Keeper, and Dwarf Fortress. 

The player can also allow additional conditions to be applied to their game (such as simulated temperature, gang activities and more extreme weather conditions) to increase the difficulty of the game and to simulate a prison in conditions nearer to reality. Players may also opt to build a female prison, which necessitates the construction of nursing and childcare facilities for female inmates that are accompanying an infant. A player's prison is graded by an in-game report according to various factors including recidivism rate of prisoners that have left the prison, overall happiness and violence levels within the prison.

Prisoners are also ranked according to five different classes, which correspond to a different temperament and length of sentence. Prisoners may be motivated to behave well to be given a lower security rating; and prisoners with poor behaviour may be given a higher security rating as punishment. Death Row prisoners arrive with a 'clemency' gauge, expressed as a percentage. This percentage can be lowered with successive failed Death Row Appeal sessions; below a certain percentage, the prisoner can be executed without legal backlash to the facility regardless of the innocence of the prisoner. Should the Death Row prisoner pass an appeal, he may be released from the prison or transferred into the general prison population. There is also a Protective Custody class that players can assign prisoners as.

Players can be 'fired' by the CEO by reaching a failure conditions, and the player is then prevented from further managing that prison.

The first "official" (non-beta) release introduced an expanded story mode as a tutorial as well as an escape mode which casts the player as a prisoner with the goal of escaping, while causing as much trouble as possible.

With the addition of the Psych Ward DLC, players are given the option to house criminally insane prisoners, and build relevant facilities to meet their needs (such as padded cells), and hire additional personnel needed to keep them in check, such as orderlies and psychiatrists. Additionally, regular prisoners may become criminally insane when they experience excessive punishment or when their needs are not regularly met (such as lack of access to food or sanitation).

Development
Prison Architect was developed by British video game studio Introversion Software. The game was announced in October 2011, shortly after Introversion postponed the development of their bank heist simulator game Subversion. The game was first made available on September 25, 2012 as an Alpha version. Developer's co-founder Mark Morris explains that independent crowd-funding has allowed them to have no time limit on the Alpha version, as well as no fees associated with crowd-funding platforms.

Introversion Software announced that a mobile version of the game was in development and the PC version of the game officially launched on October 6, 2015. In Introversion's alpha 30 video, they confirmed Prison Architect was coming to iOS and Android in October 2015 with the game's official release. The developers posted a tweet on March 21, 2013, that "I guess Prison Architect won't be coming to iPad then! Your loss Apple", with a link to a Pocket Gamer article. It was later revealed by the developer that the original direct port did not impress Apple. Due to the concern of it might not be featured on App Store's front page the project was set aside for a while. The effort to bring Prison Architect to mobile devices was resumed by Paradox Interactive as the publisher and co-developed with Tag Games. The tablet version for iPad and Android tablets was launched on May 25, 2017. Introversion announced on January 20, 2016 that Double Eleven would be bringing the game to Xbox 360, Xbox One and PlayStation 4 platforms. The console versions were released on June 28, 2016. The Xbox edition of the game was released to subscribers to Xbox Live under the Games With Gold program in September 2018.

On June 6, 2017, Double Eleven released a trailer for an expansion pack to Prison Architect, named Psych Ward, on their YouTube channel. Psych Ward was later released on Steam on November 21, 2019.

Update 16, which officially introduced multiplayer mode to the game, was released on September 4, 2018. The new mode allows up to 8 players to cooperatively build and manage a prison. This was later reduced to 4 players in a December 2018 update.

Expansion Packs

Reception

Upon its full release, the game received positive reviews, scoring 83 out of 100 on review aggregator site Metacritic. IGN awarded it a score of 8.3 out of 10, saying "Prison Architect is one of the most in-depth, satisfying builder games in ages, if you can get past the initiation." On April 7, 2016, Prison Architect won the 2016 BAFTA award in the Persistent Game category. Prison Architect was also nominated for the 2016 BAFTA award in the British Game category, which was won by Batman: Arkham Knight.

As of September 26, 2015, Prison Architect had grossed over $19 million in sales, and over 1.25 million units of the game had been sold. By the end of August 2016 when the final version '2.0' of Prison Architect was released, the number of individual players was given as two million. In June 2019, it was announced that the game had been downloaded over 4 million times across PC, console, and mobile.

See also 
 Prison Tycoon
 The Escapists

Notes

References

External links
 

2015 video games
Business simulation games
Early access video games
Indie video games
Introversion Software games
Linux games
Lua (programming language)-scripted video games
MacOS games
Nintendo Switch games
PlayStation 4 games
Video games with Steam Workshop support
Top-down video games
Video games developed in the United Kingdom
Video games set in prison
Windows games
Xbox 360 games
Xbox One games
IOS games
Android (operating system) games
Video games scored by Allister Brimble
Multiplayer and single-player video games
Crowdfunded video games
Double Eleven (company) games
BAFTA winners (video games)
Tag Games games